Semisulcospiridae, common name semisulcospirids, is a family of freshwater snails, aquatic gilled gastropod mollusks with an operculum, in the superfamily Cerithioidea. 

Semisulcospiridae diversified from the Pleuroceridae about 90 million years ago, in the Cretaceous.

Distribution 
The family Semisulcospiridae occurs in western North America, the Far East of Russia, Korea, Japan, China and Vietnam.

Taxonomy 
The family Semisulcospiridae was introduced as just a name (nomen nudum) by Morrison (1952), without a diagnosis of the taxon. It is a valid taxon however, because its name has been used as valid.

2005 taxonomy 
According to the taxonomy of Bouchet & Rocroi (2005), Semisulcospiridae was a subfamily within the family Pleuroceridae.

2009 taxonomy 
The subfamily Semisulcospirinae within the Pleuroceridae was elevated to family level as Semisulcospiridae by Strong & Köhler (2009).

Genera 
There is very high level of mitochondrial heterogeneity in apparent species of Semisulcospiridae (highest among gastropods, also with Pleuroceridae), that has not been sufficiently explained yet as of 2015.

Genera within the family Semisulcospiridae include:
 Hua S.-F. Chen, 1943 
 Juga H. Adams & A. Adams, 1854
 KoreoleptoxisJ. B. Burch & Y. Jung, 1988
 Koreoleptoxis globus
 Semisulcospira O. Boettger, 1886 - the type genus
Genera brought into synonymy
 Biwamelania Matsuoka, 1985: synonym of Semisulcospira O. Böttger, 1886
 Koreanomelania: synonym of Koreoleptoxis J. B. Burch & Y. Jung, 1988
 Namrutua Abbott, 1948: synonym of Semisulcospira O. Böttger, 1886 (junior synonym)
 "Parajuga": synonym of Juga H. Adams & A. Adams, 1854 (unavailable name: no type species designated)
 Senckenbergia Yen, 1939: synonym of Semisulcospira O. Böttger, 1886 (junior synonym)

References

 Campbell D.C. (2019). Semisulcospiridae Morrison, 1952. Pp. 81-85, in: C. Lydeard & C.S. Cummings (eds), Freshwater mollusks of the world. A distribution atlas. 242 pp. Baltimore: Johns Hopkins University Press

External links 
 Strong, E. E.; Köhler, F. (2009). Morphological and molecular analysis of 'Melania' jacqueti Dautzenberg and Fischer, 1906: from anonymous orphan to critical basal offshoot of the Semisulcospiridae (Gastropoda, Cerithioidea). Zoologica Scripta. 38(5): 483-502